Dard or DARD may refer to:

Arts and entertainment
 Dard (1947 film), a Hindi film
 Dard (1981 film), a Hindi film
 Dard Nordis, hero of the 1957 science fiction novel The Stars are Ours! by Andre Norton

Organisations
 Department of Agriculture and Rural Development, a former government department in the Northern Ireland Executive
 Détachement d'Action Rapide et de Dissuasion, a Swiss counter-terrorism and police unit

Other uses
 Dard people, an ethnic group mainly from Pakistan's Khyber Pakhtunkhwa, Gilgit-Baltistan, Indian Kashmir and Afghanistan
 Dard (surname)
 Dard (river), a river of Jura, France
 Dard Hunter, born William Joseph Hunter (1883–1966), American authority on printing, paper, and papermaking

See also
 Pointe du Dard, a mountain of Savoie, Franc
 Drad (disambiguation)